Monkey Mountain can refer to:

Monkey Mountain, Missouri, a mountain in Missouri.
Monkey Mountain, Guyana, a village in Guyana.
Shoushan (Xingcheng), a mountain in China.
Shoushan (Kaohsiung), a mountain in Kaohsiung, Taiwan
Sơn Trà Mountain, a mountain in Vietnam.